Jean-Luc Brunel (1946 – 19 February 2022) was a French model scout. He gained prominence by leading the international modelling agency Karin Models, and founded MC2 Model Management, with financing by Jeffrey Epstein. The subject of a 60 Minutes investigation in 1988, Brunel faced allegations of sexual assault spanning three decades.

Brunel came under scrutiny for his ties to Epstein with whom he worked from the early 2000s to 2015.  Brunel was accused of grooming young females and of partaking in the alleged sex trafficking ring run by Epstein. In 2019, French National Police launched an investigation on Brunel after he went into hiding following Epstein's death. He was arrested on 16 December 2020, and charged with the rape of minors by French prosecutors. However, he died from an apparent suicide before his trial could proceed.

Early life and family
Jean-Luc Brunel was born in 1946 in Paris. His father was a real estate executive. He has one brother, Arnaud.

Career
Brunel began his career in the late 1970s, working as a modeling scout for Karin Mossberg's agency, Karin Models in Paris. In 1978, he became the head of Karin Models.

In 1988, Brunel and his brother Arnaud founded the Next Management Corporation. In 1989, the Brunel brothers and Faith Kates formed the global modeling agency Next Management Company. Kates owned a majority stake in the company with the Brunel brother's Next Management Corp. owning a minority stake at 25 percent. American Photo reported that Brunel split off from Next Management Company in April 1996 with the Miami models.  Next Management Company sued the Brunel brothers in 1996.

Brunel, as a talent scout, discovered a number of models who rose to prominence, including Christy Turlington, Sharon Stone, and Milla Jovovich.  Building on these early successes, he founded Karin Models of America in 1995. After Brunel was included in a BBC MacIntyre Undercover report on abuse within the fashion industry in November 1999, he was banned from his modeling agency in Europe.

In the early 2000s, Brunel moved to the United States.  The Daily Beast reported that he relied on funding from his brother Arnaud and their business partner, Etienne des Roys. In 2003, both financiers pulled out and after the "Paris office filed to revoke Brunel’s claim to the Karin trademark in 2004," he changed the name of the agency to MC2.

Brunel had met Ghislaine Maxwell in the 1980s, and she later introduced him to the financier Jeffrey Epstein.  Brunel received funds from Epstein of "up to a million dollars" in 2004 to help launch a new modeling agency: MC2 Model Management. Brunel transformed Karin Models U.S. division into MC2 Model Management, by opening offices in New York City and Miami in 2005. The agency name evokes Epstein through a reference to Einstein's equation for mass energy equivalency or E=mc.  Clients of MC2 reportedly included Nordstrom, Macy's Inc., Saks Fifth Avenue, Neiman Marcus, JCPenney Co., Kohl's Corporation, Target Corporation, Sears, and Belk.

Virginia Roberts Giuffre, an Epstein accuser, alleged in a 2014 court filing that the system was a cover for sex trafficking. In court documents released in August 2019, Giuffre named Brunel as one of the men Maxwell had directed her as a teenager to have sex with.

In 2019, it was reported that Brunel helped create The Identity Models in New York City and 1Mother Agency in Kyiv, Ukraine. MC2 was dissolved on 27 September 2019.

Rape accusations
Brunel was the subject of a seven-month investigation by CBS producer Craig Pyes and reporter Diane Sawyer for 60 Minutes. The investigative segment "American Models in Paris", which aired on 23 October 1988, covered the conduct of Brunel and fellow Parisian modeling agent Claude Haddad. Several American models who worked with Brunel were interviewed by 60 Minutes and described their experiences of the culture Brunel fostered where the models were routinely drugged and sexually abused. Eileen Ford (of the New York-based Ford Modeling Agency) had sent her models to Brunel for Paris assignments and was interviewed for the program where she claimed no prior knowledge of the multiple complaints from models of sexual exploitation and drug abuse by Brunel.  He denied the claims, but Ford ultimately severed ties with him following the broadcast. Michael Gross reported in Model: The Ugly Business of Beautiful Women that Brunel had admitted to using cocaine for years.  Brunel defended his use by stating that he did not have a drug problem since he refrained from using cocaine during the day.

In 2002, Brunel was again associated with abuse after Elite supermodel Karen Mulder described to the French press the culture of sexual misconduct and manipulation prevalent in the modeling industry.

Virginia Giuffre accused Brunel of having sexually trafficked girls for Epstein. Giuffre claimed in a 2015 affidavit that Epstein bragged to her that he had “slept with over 1,000 of Brunel’s girls.” Brunel responded by denying involvement in any illegal activities with Epstein, saying, "I strongly deny having committed any illicit act or any wrongdoing in the course of my work as a scouter or model agencies manager." From 1998 to 2005, Brunel was listed as a passenger in flight logs for Epstein's private plane on 25 trips. He was also a regular visitor to the jail where Epstein was held in 2008, with at least 70 recorded visits.

Brunel sued Epstein in 2015, claiming that he and MC2 had "lost multiple contacts and business in the modelling business as a result of Epstein’s illegal actions." He also alleged that Epstein had obstructed justice by directing Brunel to avoid having his deposition taken in the criminal case against Epstein by the Palm Beach Police Department. The lawsuit was later dismissed.

In 2019, it was revealed that Brunel was among those named in court documents from a civil suit by Virginia Roberts Giuffre against Ghislaine Maxwell. The documents were unsealed on August 9, 2019, a day before Epstein's death. Giuffre alleges that she was sexually trafficked by Epstein and Maxwell to several high-profile individuals, including Brunel, while she was underage in the early 2000s.

Brunel was last seen in public at the Paris Country Club on 5 July 2019. Following Epstein's death in August 2019, Brunel went into hiding; shortly thereafter, the French National Police launched an investigation into him. In September 2019, his Paris home and offices were searched by French investigators as part of a probe into sex trafficking by Epstein.

Arrest and indictment
On 16 December 2020, Brunel was intercepted by police at Charles de Gaulle airport in Paris, as he was about to board a flight to Dakar, Senegal. He was then placed under 'garde à vue' custody for questioning in relation to rape, sexual assault, criminal conspiracy,  and human trafficking, with all of the allegations involving minors.

Brunel was charged on 29 June 2021, with drugging and raping a 17-year-old girl in the 1990/2000s. Brunel said he was innocent.

Personal life and death
Brunel was married to Helen Hogberg, a Swedish model. Hogberg divorced Brunel in 1979. In 1988, he married his girlfriend of two years, American model Roberta Chirko. The couple later divorced.

On 19 February 2022, Brunel was found dead in his jail cell in La Santé prison, after allegedly hanging himself.

References

External links 
Video of "American Girls in Paris" 60 Minutes, 1988

1946 births
2022 deaths
2022 suicides
20th-century French businesspeople
21st-century French businesspeople
Businesspeople from Paris
Date of birth missing
French male criminals
French expatriates in the United States
Jeffrey Epstein
People charged with rape
People charged with sex crimes
Suicides by hanging in France